Cell division protein kinase 10 is an enzyme that in humans is encoded by the CDK10 gene.

Function 

The protein encoded by this gene belongs to the CDK subfamily of the Ser/Thr protein kinase family. The CDK subfamily members are highly similar to the gene products of S. cerevisiae cdc28, and S. pombe cdc2, and are known to be essential for cell cycle progression. This kinase has been shown to play a role in cellular proliferation. Its function is limited to cell cycle G2-M phase. At least three alternatively spliced transcript variants encoding different isoforms have been reported, two of which contain multiple non-AUG translation initiation sites.

Interactions 

Cyclin-dependent kinase 10 has been shown to interact with ETS2.

References

Further reading

External links 
 

Cell cycle
EC 2.7.11